"Two Fathers" is the eleventh episode of the sixth season and the 128th episode overall of the science fiction television series The X-Files. The episode first aired in the United States and Canada on February 7, 1999, on the Fox Network and subsequently aired in the United Kingdom on Sky1. It was written by executive producers Chris Carter and Frank Spotnitz and directed by Kim Manners. The episode earned a Nielsen rating of 11.5, a total of 18.81 million viewers. The episode received mostly positive reviews.

The show centers on FBI special agents Fox Mulder (David Duchovny) and Dana Scully (Gillian Anderson) who work on cases linked to the paranormal, called X-Files. Mulder is a believer in the paranormal, while the skeptical Scully has been assigned to debunk his work. "Two Fathers" follows a story which would lead to the destruction of the Syndicate: with the unexpected return of Cassandra Spender and the alien rebels, members of the Syndicate prepare themselves for the final invasion.

"Two Fathers" was written in order to eliminate the Syndicate and relaunch the series' mythology. With the series being shot in Los Angeles, many members of The X-Files crew had to adjust scenes and filming techniques in order to achieve the "dark and gray feel" that had been a result of filming in Vancouver, British Columbia. The episode is the first of a two-part episode and continues with the episode "One Son".

Plot 
In a train car, doctors in chemical suits are making incisions on an unseen patient's stomach; green fluid seeps out of the wounds, which heal themselves. When Dr. Eugene Openshaw arrives, he is informed that their twenty-five-year-old project is finally completed. Moments later, rebel aliens begin to appear and start burning all the doctors, the survivor being Dr. Openshaw and a patient, Cassandra Spender, who had been missing for over a year. Walter Skinner takes her son, Jeffrey Spender, to the scene, where he meets with his mother. Cassandra refuses to talk with Jeffrey about what happened to her because she knows that he won't believe her. She asks for Fox Mulder (David Duchovny).  Spender then 'asks' Mulder to join him to meet his mother, but Mulder sees it as an attempt to entrap him.  Later on, Dr. Openshaw informs the Cigarette Smoking Man (William B. Davis) about the completion of the project, saying he needs to kill his former wife since she is the first successful alien-human hybrid. The Cigarette Smoking Man's reaction leads to Dr. Openshaw's death. Meanwhile, one of the Syndicate elders is killed by an alien rebel, who then takes on his form.

Mulder and partner Dana Scully (Gillian Anderson) go over the crime scene photos from the train car incident and immediately recognize similarities to murders from a year earlier.  Afterwards, Mulder and Scully visit Cassandra at the hospital who informs them that the aliens are here to destroy all life on Earth, further stating that this alien threat moves through the Universe to colonize other planets. She claims that a rebel force of aliens are mutilating their faces to prevent infection by the black oil.

Alex Krycek reports to the Syndicate on the rebel's recent attacks. The rebel, masquerading as the elder he killed, proposes that the Syndicate align themselves with the rebels. The Cigarette Smoking Man seems to recognize that the elder has opposed his own previous opinion—that siding with the rebels is suicide.

Mulder and Scully use the computer on the X-Files' office to find the Cigarette Smoking Man's real identity, that he is Agent Spender's father, C.G.B. Spender. Their unauthorized entry at the X-Files office is discovered by Agent Spender, resulting in both agents' immediate suspension from the FBI. Agent Spender, who then reports to the Cigarette Smoking Man demanding the truth, but is refused. Scully meets with Mulder, telling him that C.G.B. Spender is likely another alias and that the man is linked with Mulder's father, William, who he had worked with on the secret state project. The Cigarette Smoking Man decides to give Agent Spender more responsibility by having him kill the alien rebel masquerading as a Syndicate elder. Spender fails in his task, but Krycek comes to his aid and finishes. Krycek reveals to Spender that his father was responsible for his mother's (Cassandra's) abductions and that his role is to protect his father's stake in the project. This fact upsets Agent Spender.

The Cigarette Smoking Man then reveals everything to Agent Diana Fowley, who agrees to help him. Mulder tells Skinner that Cassandra is in danger because she is the first successful alien-human hybrid; Skinner goes to the hospital to check on Cassandra but finds her gone. Cassandra, having escaped from the hospital, arrives at Mulder's apartment and demands that he shoot her because she is the embodiment of fifty years of work by the Syndicate — an alien-human hybrid that will trigger colonization if the aliens learn of her existence. Just then, someone bangs on the apartment door.

Production 

The plan to eliminate the Syndicate and relaunch the series' mythology in a new direction was originally conceived in September 1998. Director Kim Manners stated "I've said for years that the show really resolved itself, if you will, by accident. The whole story line of the Syndicate and the bees and the aliens and the chips in the neck, they all seemed to just accidentally fall into place and create an intriguing, mysterious storyline that eventually got so mysterious and so intriguing that Chris had to blow it up, because he couldn't deal with it anymore."

The original script featured various flashback sequences, with actors Peter Donat, William B. Davis and Veronica Cartwright all appearing around twenty-to-thirty years younger. The production crew applied various types of makeup on the actors to "de-age" them. However, the writers eventually came to the conclusion that it "just didn't [...] work", so they cut out most of that storyline, which ultimately led to the creation of a whole new direction in which the Cigarette Smoking Man provided a monologue explaining the history of the project instead. The first scene was shot in Long Beach, California.

The scene in which Jeffrey Spender visited his mother, Cassandra Spender, was shot in Los Angeles. Those members of The X-Files crew who had moved with the show from Vancouver to Los Angeles still had problems adjusting to the changes when filming an episode. They were forced to adjust to changes in the sunlight, since Vancouver had this "dark and gray feel" compared to California's sunny atmosphere. Kim Manners felt it was difficult to "get[ting] used to" the new filming area. This episode marks the first time new stock footage was used for the J. Edgar Hoover Building in over five years.

The Second Elder's house was in a relatively expensive neighborhood in Los Angeles. Manners stated that he was "very nervous" when filming this scene because the crew needed to create a fire inside the house, which was done by Kelly Kerby and Bobby Calvert. When the faceless alien attacks the Second Elder, a special effects crew member can be seen behind a window "running with his rig", according to Manners.

Release and reception 
The episode earned a Nielsen household rating of 11.5, with a 16 share. It was viewed by a total of 18.81 million viewers in the United States. The episode was the third highest rated episode of the sixth season. The episode debuted in the United States and Canada on February 7, 1999, at the Fox Network. The episode aired in the United Kingdom and Ireland on Sky1 on May 16, 1999, and received 0.72 million viewers, making it the third most watched episode that week. Veronica Cartwright was nominated for an Emmy for "Outstanding Guest Actress in a Drama Series" for her role in this episode and "One Son", and the make-up department was nominated for an Emmy award in the category "Outstanding Makeup for a Series" and won. The episode was later included on The X-Files Mythology, Volume 3 – Colonization, a DVD collection that contains episodes involved with the alien Colonist's plans to take over the earth.

The episode received mostly positive reviews from critics. Tom Kessenich, in his book Examination: An Unauthorized Look at Seasons 6–9 of the X-Files wrote positively of the episode, saying it "wonderfully" developed the show's characters as "it unveiled many of the answers to the questions that have been dangling about for some time without using Mulder or Scully as conduits for many of these answers." The main reason behind creating a resolution to the Syndicate arc was that Chris Carter thought the series was going to be cancelled by early 2000. While promoting the episode, Carter said it would give many long-waited answers but at the same time create new ones. Earl Cressey from DVD Talk named "Two Fathers," along with its follow-up "One Son," as one of the "highlights of season six."  Joyce Millman from Salon magazine said the episode (along with "One Son") was one "of the most coherent, [...] almost unbearably tense, hours in the series' run". The Michigan Daily reviewer Melissa Runstrom said "Two Fathers" along with "One Son" and season finale "Biogenesis" were the highlights of the sixth season.

Emily VanDerWerff of The A.V. Club awarded the episode a "B−" rating. She concluded that the episode is an example of "propulsive fun" and applauded its myriad of attention-grabbing sequences. However, she was critical of its plot, noting that "the series pretty much just picks Cassandra to be the answer to a lot of questions" concerning the show's mythology. Not all reviews were so glowing. Paula Vitaris from Cinefantastique gave the episode a mixed review and awarded it two stars out of four. Vitaris wrote positively of the episode's filming, writing, "visually, the episode looks good […] but the scenes in the hangar are eye-poppers, with doors slowly opening and aliens walking forward, obscured by bright light." However, she criticized the episode's plot, noting that "Two Fathers" was "heading straight down a path already trodden by dozens of books, short stories, movies, and other television shows."

Footnotes

Bibliography

External links 

 

1999 American television episodes
Television episodes written by Chris Carter
Television episodes set in Maryland
The X-Files (season 6) episodes
Television episodes set in Virginia